Pan profesor, nepřítel žen is a 1913 Austro-Hungarian comedy film.

External links
 

1913 comedy films
1913 films
Austrian silent films
Hungarian black-and-white films
Austrian black-and-white films
Hungarian silent films
Austrian comedy films
Hungarian comedy films
Austro-Hungarian films
Lost Czech films